Starting in 2016, members of the United States women's national soccer team (USWNT) have engaged in a series of legal actions against the United States Soccer Federation, accusing the organization of unequal treatment and compensation. The fight for equal pay has received widespread media attention, inspired legislative action in the U.S. Senate, and received popular support, including fan chants of "Equal pay" at the 2019 FIFA Women's World Cup matches in France. A landmark equal pay agreement was reached in February 2022.

2016 complaint
In March 2016, five women players (Alex Morgan, Hope Solo, Carli Lloyd, Megan Rapinoe, and Becky Sauerbrunn) filed a complaint with the Equal Employment Opportunity Commission accusing the Federation of systematically paying women players less than their male counterparts in violation of Title VII and the Equal Pay Act. In April 2016, Carli Lloyd published an essay in the New York Times entitled "Why I'm Fighting for Equal Pay," which emphasized that the U.S. women's team generates more revenue for the U.S. Soccer Federation, but that the Federation was still unwilling to pay the women comparably to the male players.

Separately, in February 2016, the U.S. Women's National Team Players Association filed a complaint in U.S. District court seeking to void an extension of its collective bargaining agreement with the United States Soccer Federation through the end of 2016. On July 3, 2016, the court ruled that the extension was valid and that the Players Association was bound by a no-strike provision in the agreement until December 31, 2016.

2019 gender discrimination lawsuit
In March 2019, all 28 players on the U.S. women's national soccer team roster filed a gender discrimination lawsuit against the United States Soccer Federation in the United States District Court in Los Angeles. The 2019 lawsuit claimed that discrimination by the Federation impacted player compensation, where and how frequently they play, training, medical treatment, coaching, and travel arrangements to matches. This action brought an end to the 2016 Equal Employment Opportunity Commission complaint, which was never resolved.

On the claims of wage discrimination, the petitioners pointed out that United States men's national soccer team (USMNT) receive a $5,000 bonus for a loss in a friendly match, while women receive nothing for a loss or a draw. However, when the teams win, the men receive as much as $17,625, but women only receive $1,350. Further, in 2011, when the women placed second in their World Cup, they were awarded $1.8 million, split evenly among the 24 players on the team. The men's team made it only to the round of 16 that year, yet they were awarded $5 million. In 2014, when Germany won the Men's World Cup, the US team was awarded $35 million by FIFA, while the women received 5% of that for their Cup victory in 2015.

The United States Soccer Federation responded to the complaint in a statement detailing its efforts to promote women's soccer, including its support of the National Women's Soccer League.

In May 2020, U.S. District Judge R. Gary Klausner dismissed the unequal pay

 portion of the lawsuit, while allowing the claims of discriminatory work conditions to proceed. Judge Klausner found that the USWNT were paid more in total and more per game than the USMNT during the contested years. The Judge also noted that the USWT were offered a similar “pay for play” agreement but rejected that offer. In October 2021, Klausner approved a settlement between U.S. Soccer and the women's team on working conditions. Following that agreement, the players appealed Klausner's dismissal of their equal pay complaints. Oral arguments in an appeal filed to the 9th Circuit Court of Appeals began in early 2022. The U.S. women's team's collective bargaining agreement expired at the end of December, 2021, and the U.S. Soccer Federation expressed hoped that a resolution could be reached outside the court system.

2022 equal pay agreement
On February 22, 2022, U.S. Women's National Team players filed an Equal Employment Opportunity Commission complaint over inequality in pay and treatment, the U.S. Soccer Federation agreed to a landmark $24 million agreement which will see tens of millions of dollars in back pay owed to female players. The terms of settlement also require equal pay for both male and female soccer player for friendlies, tournaments and even the World Cup. This means that the USWNT will receive a share of the prize money from the 2022 FIFA World Cup games. They received more from the USMNT games in the group stage of the 2022 World Cup than the total they received for winning the past two FIFA Women's World Cup tournaments.

Reactions and popular media
In 2019, Senator Joe Manchin of West Virginia introduced a bill that proposed to cut off all federal funding to the men's 2026 FIFA World Cup until the women received equal pay. In 2020, then US presidential candidate Joe Biden called on the team to not "give up this fight," and demand US Soccer "pay now," or "when I'm president, you can go elsewhere for World Cup funding." The lawsuit from the USWNT members is similar to actions in other sports and employment fields where women are systematically paid less than their male counterparts. The attention reignited a conversation about the pay disparities of genders in the workplace. Following the 2019 World Cup victory of the U.S. women's team, Senator Kamala Harris said, "As we celebrate the @USWNT today, it's on us to take up their charge and fight for equal pay. Let's flip the script and hold corporations accountable by requiring them to prove they're not engaging in pay discrimination — and fine companies that fail to close their pay gaps."

The story of the U.S. women's national soccer team and their fight for equal pay was the subject of the 2021 documentary film LFG directed and produced by Andrea Nix Fine and Sean Fine.

References

Gender pay gap
Sports labor disputes in the United States
United States Soccer Federation
History of the United States women's national soccer team
2016 in American soccer
2022 in American soccer
2019 in American soccer